(shorten to Förvaltningsstiftelsen; abbreviated to SRT or Foundation Management for SR, SVT, and UR) is a Swedish public broadcasting organisation that administers the SVT, SR and the UR.

History 
The advent of cable, satellite and commercial television in 1980s Sweden was considered to be a turbulent period within the Swedish mass media sector, which was until then entirely dominated by the monopoly public radio and television channels as well as the domestic press. 

In the spring of 1993, the Riksdag decided, after a one-man investigation, to change the ownership of the public service broadcasters to reflect the greatly altered mass media landscape. Prior to the amendment, the shares of the Swedish public broadcasting service had been divided between the Swedish social movements (folkrörelser; 60% [until 1967 40%]), the business community (näringslivet; 20%) and the daily press (dagspressen; 20% [until 1967 40%]). The three ownership groups now no longer wanted to continue as owners, in part because some of them had engaged in competing activities.

The three public broadcasters (SVT, SR and UR), through said amendment came to be owned by separate management foundations from 1 January 1994. However, these three fiduciary foundations had an identical board composition and the same overall objectives. As an alternative to the foundation form, it was discussed, among other things, to place them directly under state ownership, but this option was considered inappropriate as such a solution would place the organisation directly under the executive branch of the Swedish government.

The Förvaltningsstiftelsen was formed in 1997 through the merger of the foundations managing SVT, SR and UR. The Swedish government and the Riksdag considered that this organisational change was justified because the three management foundations had the same overall goals.

Representation in international organisations 
SRT (and its predecessors) holds the Swedish membership of the European Broadcasting Union.

References

External links 

 

Foundations based in Sweden
Foundation Management for SR, SVT, and UR
Publicly funded broadcasters
Organizations based in Sweden
Television channels in Sweden
European Broadcasting Union members
Mass media in Stockholm
State media
Mass media companies established in 1997